The Sikhote-Alin is a mountain range in Primorsky and Khabarovsk Krais, Russia, extending about  to the northeast of the Russian Pacific seaport of Vladivostok.

Geography
Sikhote-Alin is a temperate zone, though species typical of northern taiga (such as reindeer and the Ussuri brown bear) coexist with the Amur tiger, Amur leopard, and Asiatic black bear. The region holds very few wolves, due to competition with tigers. The longest-lived tree in the region is a millennium-old Japanese yew.

Many tributaries of the Amur River lie within the range, including the Gur.

The core zone can only be explored in a company of rangers.

History
The name is thought to be of Manchu origin ( "mountain").

In the 1910s and 1920s, Sikhote-Alin was extensively explored by Russian geographer and naturalist Vladimir Arsenyev (1872–1930), who described his adventures in several books, notably Dersu Uzala (1923), which in 1975 was turned into an Oscar-winning film by Akira Kurosawa. Largely due to his exploration and advocacy, the large Sikhote-Alin and Lazo wildlife refuges were set up in 1935 to preserve the region's unusual wildlife.

On February 12, 1947, one of the largest meteorite showers in recent history occurred in the mountains range.

In 2001, UNESCO placed "Central Sikhote-Alin" onto the World Heritage List, citing its importance for "the survival of endangered species such as the scaly-sided (Chinese) merganser, Blakiston's fish-owl and the Amur tiger".

References

External links

 UNESCO — Sikhote-Alin World Heritage Site
Natural Heritage Protection Fund: Central Sikhote-Alin - at Natural Heritage Protection Fund
 Zhuravlev, Yu. N., ed. (2000) Стратегия сохранения биоразнообразия Сихотэ-Алиня = A Biodiversity Conservation Strategy for the Sikhote-Alin' Vladivostok: Russian Academy of Sciences, Far Eastern Branch

 
Landforms of the Russian Far East
World Heritage Sites in Russia
Landforms of Primorsky Krai
Mountain ranges of Khabarovsk Krai
Mountain ranges of Russia